Chemi-ionization is the formation of an ion through the reaction of a gas phase atom or molecule with an atom or molecule in an excited state while also creating new bonds. This process is helpful in mass spectrometry because it creates unique bands that can be used to identify molecules. This process is extremely common in nature as it is considered the primary initial reaction in flames.

History 
The term chemi-ionization was coined by Hartwell F. Calcote in 1948 in the Third Symposium on Combustion and Flame, and Explosion Phenomena.  The Symposium performed much of the early investigation into this phenomenon in the 1950s. The majority of the research on this topic was performed in the 1960s and '70s. It is currently seen in many different ionization techniques used for mass spectrometry.

Reactions
Chemi-ionization can be represented by
G^\ast{} + M -> M^{+\bullet}{} + e^-{} + G
where G is the excited state species (indicated by the super-scripted asterisk), and M is the species that is ionized by the loss of an electron to form the radical cation (indicated by the super-scripted "plus-dot").

The most common example of A-type chemi-ionization occurs in hydrocarbon flame. The reaction can be represented as

O + CH -> HCO+ + e^- 

This reaction is present in any hydrocarbon flame and can account for deviation in the amount of expected ions from thermodynamic equilibrium. This can then lead to B-type chemi-ionization which can be represented as

HCO+{} + e^- -> \binom{H3O+}{C3H3} + M -> M+{} + products 

As well as

CH{} + O{} + M -> CHO{} + M^\ast -> M{} + \mathit{hv}

Where M* represents an excited state metal. This reaction illustrates the light generated by the chemi-ionization reaction resulting in the light we know from flames.

Astrophysical implications
Chemi-ionization has been postulated to occur in the hydrogen rich atmospheres surrounding stars. This type of reaction would lead to many more excited hydrogen atoms than some models account for. This affects our ability to determine the proper optical qualities of solar atmospheres with modeling.

See also
Penning ionization
Associative ionization
Charge-exchange ionization

References

Ion source